Sir Arnold Whittaker Wolfendale FRS (25 June 1927 – 21 December 2020) was a British astronomer who served as the fourteenth Astronomer Royal from 1991 to 1995. He was Professor of Physics at Durham University from 1965 until 1992 and served as president of the European Physical Society (1999–2001). He was President of the Royal Astronomical Society from 1981 to 1983.

Education and background
His family moved to Flixton, Lancashire when he was 18 months. He attended Stretford Grammar School near Manchester. Wolfendale graduated with a Bachelor of Science in physics from the University of Manchester in 1948, followed by a PhD in 1953 and a Doctor of Science in 1970.

Career
During his career he held academic posts at the universities of University of Manchester (1951–6), Durham University (1956–92), the University of Ceylon and the University of Hong Kong.  He was Professor of Physics at Durham 1965–92, including a period as head of department, and remained an emeritus professor until his death.

In 1965, he was part of the team that first detected neutrinos at the Kolar Gold Fields.

Publications 

Arnold Wolfendale publications in arxiv.org

 Arnold Wolfendale publications at the SAO/NASA Astrophysics Data System

Arnold Wolfendale publications in Google Scholar
Arnold Wolfendale publications at Scopus (subscription required for more than 10)
Royal Society

Awards and honours
Wolfendale was elected a fellow of the Royal Astronomical Society in 1973, and a Fellow of the Royal Society in 1977. He served as Astronomer Royal from 1991 to 1995. In 1992, Wolfendale retired from teaching, and he was knighted in 1995. In 1996 he became Professor of Experimental Physics with the Royal Institution of Great Britain. A lecture theatre in Durham University's new Calman Learning Centre has been named in his honour. He was an honorary DSc of Bucharest University and foreign member of the Bulgarian Academy of Sciences. His nomination for the Royal Society reads

Other Activities 

In 1992 Wolfendale became Patron of the Society for Popular Astronomy and was a keen supporter of its activities. He opened Kielder Observatory, Northumberland in 2008, and was its Patron. In 2009 he was the 156th President of the Birmingham and Midland Institute. From April 2013, he was one of the two Honorary Vice Presidents of the Society for the History of Astronomy.

Personal life 
He married Audrey Darby in 1951. They had twin sons. His wife Audrey died in 2007. He married anthropologist Dorothy Middleton, at Durham Cathedral, on 5 September 2015. Wolfendale died in December 2020 at the age of 93.

References

External links
Portrait of Sir Arnold Wolfendale at pictures.royalsociety.org
 
 
 
 
 Prof Sir Arnold Wolfendale, Staff profile at Durham University

1927 births
2020 deaths
Academics of Durham University
Alumni of the University of Manchester
Astronomers Royal
20th-century British astronomers
English atheists
Fellows of the Royal Society
Foreign Fellows of the Indian National Science Academy
Knights Bachelor
People educated at Stretford Grammar School
People from Flixton, Greater Manchester
People from Rugby, Warwickshire
Presidents of the Institute of Physics
Presidents of the Royal Astronomical Society
Presidents of the European Physical Society